The Type 1 was an automobile designed by Ettore Bugatti and produced by Prinetti & Stucchi in 1899.  It had four engines, two on each side of the rear axle. The first real production Bugatti was the Bugatti Type 13.

1